Neurofibrillary tangles (NFTs) are aggregates of hyperphosphorylated tau protein that are most commonly known as a primary biomarker of Alzheimer's disease. Their presence is also found in numerous other diseases known as tauopathies. Little is known about their exact relationship to the different pathologies.

Formation
Neurofibrillary tangles are formed by hyperphosphorylation of a microtubule-associated protein known as tau, causing it to aggregate, or group, in an insoluble form. (These aggregations of hyperphosphorylated tau protein are also referred to as PHF, or "paired helical filaments"). The precise mechanism of tangle formation is not completely understood, and it is still controversial whether tangles are a primary causative factor in disease or play a more peripheral role.

Cytoskeletal changes
Three different maturation states of NFT have been defined using  anti-tau and anti-ubiquitin immunostaining. At stage 0 there are morphologically normal pyramidal cells showing diffuse or fine granular cytoplasmic staining with anti-tau. In other words, cells are healthy with minimal tau presence; at stage 1 some delicate elongate inclusions are stained by tau antibodies (these are early tangles); stage 2 is represented by the classic NFT demonstration with anti-tau staining; stage 3 is exemplified by ghost tangles (tangles outside of cells where the host neuron has died), which are characterized by a reduced anti-tau but marked anti-ubiquitin immunostaining.

Causes

Mutated tau
The traditional understanding is that tau binds to microtubules and assists with their self-assembly, formation and stabilization. However, when tau is hyperphosphorylated, it is unable to bind and the microtubules become unstable and begin disintegrating. The unbound tau clumps together in formations called neurofibrillary tangles. More explicitly, intracellular lesions known as pretangles develop when tau is phosphorylated excessively and on improper amino acid residues. These lesions, over time, develop into filamentous interneuronal neurofibrillary tangles (NFTs) which interfere with numerous intracellular functions. Seeking a reliable animal model for tau-related pathologies, researchers expressed the human mutant P301L tau gene in adult mice. This experiment resulted in the formation of neurofibrillary tangles and pretangle formations. The human mutant P301 tau gene is associated with frontotemporal dementia with parkinsonism, another tauopathy associated with NFTs. It was found that the degree of tau pathology was dependent on time and the level of gene expression. Groups receiving a combination of a promoter and enhancer in the vector saw increased tau expression, as early as 3 weeks after vector injection, which was measured using a Western blot. These groups also showed a greater pathology compared to those with less expression of the mutant tau. Additionally, NFTs were clearly detected by immunoelectron microscopy at 4 months but not at 2 months. However, at both 2 and 4 months, pretangle-like structures were observed suggesting the NFT formation is not complete by 4 months and will continue to progress with time.

Traumatic brain injury 
Preliminary research indicates that iron deposits due to hemorrhaging, following traumatic brain injury (TBI), may increase tau pathology. While TBI does not routinely lead to accelerated NFT formation, further work may determine if other blood components or factors unrelated to hemorrhages are involved in this TBI-induced augmentation of tau pathology. NFTs are most commonly seen associated with repetitive mild TBI as opposed to one instance of severe traumatic brain injury. For example, the neurodegenerative disease chronic traumatic encephalopathy (CTE), previously called dementia pugilistica, is highly associated with NFTs and neuropil threads.

Aluminium
The idea that there is a link between aluminium exposure and the formation of neurofibrillary tangles has floated around the scientific community for some time without having been definitively proved or disregarded. Recently a study examining the hippocampal CA1 cells from individuals with and without Alzheimer's disease showed a small portion of the pyramidal cells contain cytoplasmic pools within their somas containing early NFTs. These cytoplasmic pools are aggregates of an aluminium/hyperphosphorylated tau complex similar to mature NFTs. (Walton) While a connection between aluminium and NFTs and AD is maintained, there is evidence that aluminium does not directly cause the formation of NFTs or AD. However it is claimed that chronic aluminium intake can cause Alzheimer's by disrupting the microtubules in the filaments.

Pathology
It has been shown that the degree of cognitive impairment in diseases such as AD is significantly correlated with the presence of neurofibrillary tangles.

Harmful or protective?
There has been some suggestion that the formation of NFTs does not have a causal relationship with disease. Rather that NFTs may be produced in response to a variety of conditions and may in fact be a compensatory response against oxidative stress and serves a protective function. Several points are made to argue the position that NFTs are perhaps protective instead of harmful. First there appears to be a dispute as to the impact of neurofibrillary tangles on neuronal viability because some neurons containing NFTs survive for decades. Furthermore, NFTs have been found in apparently healthy individuals, indicating that NFTs are not directly related to neural degeneration. It has been proposed that the formation of NFTs is part of a multifaceted compensatory response where oxidative insult activates several kinases, which are then capable of phosphorylating tau. This then prompts the early formation of NFTs, which reduce oxidative damage and prolong the function of the neuron. While the theory is intriguing, scientists have not come to a firm conclusion as to what role NFTs play in neurodegenerative diseases.

Results from the new study  suggest that a specific phosphorylation of tau (at threonine-205) has a protective effect on neurons in a mouse model of excitotoxic, amyloid beta toxicity. The authors suggest that the reason tau becomes modified is to protect from damage caused by amyloid protein aggregation. A protein called kinase p38γ phosphorylates tau at the threonine-205 amino acid. The activity of this gamma kinase enzyme is mostly lost as Alzheimer Disease progresses, suggesting a loss of this protective effect. Reintroducing p38γ and increasing its activity prevented memory deficits from occurring in their mouse model, suggesting this enzyme as a potential target for future therapies. However increasing the activity of kinases has been shown to be difficult).

Neuron loss
Traditionally believed to play a major role in neuron loss, NFTs are an early event in pathologies such as Alzheimer's disease, and as more NFTs form, there is substantially more neuron loss. However, it has been shown that there is significant neuron loss before the formation of neurofibrillary tangles, and that NFTs account for only a small proportion (around 8.1%) of this neuron loss. Coupled with the longevity of neurons containing NFTs, it is likely that some other factor is primarily responsible for the bulk of neuron loss in these diseases, not the formation of neurofibrillary tangles.

Primary age-related tauopathy vs. classical Alzheimer's
It is currently unclear as to whether or not primary age-related tauopathy (PART), a term in which includes some cases formerly referred to as neurofibrillary tangle-predominant dementia (NFTPD) or tangle-only dementia, is a variant of the traditional Alzheimer's disease, or a distinct entity. Characterized by later onset and milder cognitive impairment, the distribution of NFT pathology is more closely related to that found in centenarians showing no or limited cognitive impairment. NFTs are generally limited to allocortical/limbic regions of the brain with limited progression to the neocortex but a greater density in the allocortical/hippocampal region. Plaques are generally absent.

Alzheimer disease with concomitant dementia with Lewy bodies (AD+DLB) 
The degree of NFT involvement in AD is defined by Braak staging. Braak stages I and II are used when NFT involvement is confined mainly to the transentorhinal region of the brain. Stages III and IV are indicated when there is involvement of limbic regions such as the hippocampus, and V and VI when there's extensive neocortical involvement. This should not be confused with the degree of senile plaque involvement, which progresses differently.

Neurofibrillary tangle and modified Braak scores were lower in AD+DLB, however, neocortical NFT scores show markedly different patterns between AD+DLB and Classical Alzheimer's. In pure AD, NFT are predominantly found at a high frequency: In AD+DLB, the distribution of NFT frequency was found to be bimodal: NFTs were either frequent or few to absent. Additionally, neocortical NFT frequency in the AD+DLB group tended to parallel the severity of other types of tau cytopathology.

Link to aggression and depression in people living with Alzheimer's disease
A recent study looked for correlation between the quantitative aspects of Alzheimer's disease (neuron loss, neuritic plaque and neurofibrillary tangle load) and aggression frequently found in Alzheimer's patients. It was found that only an increase in neurofibrillary tangle load was associated with severity of aggression and chronic aggression in Alzheimer's patients. While this study does indicate a correlation between NFT load and severity of aggression, it does not provide a causative argument.

Research has also indicated that patients with AD and comorbid depression show higher levels of neurofibrillary tangle formation than individuals with AD but no depression. Comorbid depression increased the odds for advanced neuropathologic disease stage even when controlling for age, gender, education and cognitive function.

Treatment

Statins
Statins have been shown to reduce the neurofibrillary tangle burden in mouse models, likely due to their anti-inflammatory capacities.

Cyclin-dependent kinase 5
Cyclin-dependent kinase 5 (CDK5) is a kinase that has been previously hypothesized to contribute to tau pathologies.  RNA interference (RNAi) mediated silencing of the CDK5 gene has been proposed as a novel therapeutic strategy against tau pathology, such as neurofibrillary tangles. Knockdown of CDK5 has been shown to reduce the phosphorylation of tau in primary neuronal cultures and in mouse models. Furthermore, this silencing showed a dramatic reduction in the number of neurofibrillary tangles. However, in conditions such as Alzheimer's disease, only about 1% is hereditary, and therefore RNAi therapy may be inadequate for addressing the needs of the majority of those who have this disease.

Lithium
Lithium has been shown to decrease the phosphorylation of tau. Lithium treatment has been shown to reduce the density of neurofibrillary tangles in transgenic models in the hippocampus and spinal cord. Despite the decrease in density of NFTs, motor and memory  deficits were not seen to improve following treatment. Additionally, no preventive effects have been seen in patients undergoing lithium treatment.

Curcumin
Curcumin (as Longvida) has been shown to reduce memory deficit and tau monomers in animal models, however no clinical trials have shown curcumin to remove tau from the brain.

Other conditions
Progressive supranuclear palsy although with straight filament rather than PHF tau
Dementia pugilistica (chronic traumatic encephalopathy)
Frontotemporal dementia and parkinsonism linked to chromosome 17 however without detectable β-amyloid plaques.
Lytico-Bodig disease (Parkinson-dementia complex of Guam)
Ganglioglioma and gangliocytoma
Meningioangiomatosis
Subacute sclerosing panencephalitis
As well as lead encephalopathy, tuberous sclerosis, Pantothenate kinase-associated neurodegeneration, and lipofuscinosis

See also 
 Proteopathy

References

External links
 Pathologic page about Neurofibrillary tangles, by the University of Oklahoma.
 http://www.termedia.pl/magazine.php?magazine_id=20&article_id=5368&magazine_subpage=ABSTRACT
https://web.archive.org/web/20051028184424/http://www.lifesci.sussex.ac.uk/home/Julian_Thorpe/ad_cyto.htm#tau
 It Takes Tau to Tangle : Plaques, Tangles and Neurodegenerative Disease (requires Flash video software)
 The Truth about Neurofibrillary Tangles (Flash video)
 Neurofibrillary Tangles - a definition (Flash video)
 Neurofibrillary Tangles in Alzheimer's Disease (Flash video)

Alzheimer's disease
Neuropathology